Victor Erik Olof Hedman (born 18 December 1990) is a Swedish professional ice hockey defenseman and alternate captain for the Tampa Bay Lightning of the National Hockey League (NHL). Hedman was selected second overall by the Lightning in the 2009 NHL Entry Draft.

Widely considered to be one of the best defensemen in the NHL, Hedman is a five-time James Norris Memorial Trophy finalist, winning the award in 2018. Hedman won back-to-back Stanley Cups with the Lightning in 2020 and 2021, and won the Conn Smythe Trophy as the most valuable player in the 2020 playoffs.

Playing career

Modo Hockey

Hedman began his junior ice hockey career in the Swedish J20 SuperElit with the Modo Hockey organization. He recorded 25 points in 34 games during his first full season in the league in 2006–07. Hedman then turned professional and joined the Elitserien with Modo at the age of 16. At the beginning of the 2008–09 season, he was ranked first overall amongst all draft-eligible skaters in the International Scouting Services' preliminary rankings. In the same season, he was nominated as the SHL Rookie of the Year. Following his performance at the 2009 World Junior Championships for Sweden, Hedman was listed atop the rankings of European skaters by the NHL Central Scouting Bureau. Despite the unlikelihood of Hedman playing in Russia, he was drafted 83rd overall by the Kontinental Hockey League (KHL)'s Spartak Moscow on 1 June 2009.

Going into the 2009 NHL Entry Draft, Hedman was listed as the second-ranked player and top European player. He was drafted second overall by the Tampa Bay Lightning, second to John Tavares who was drafted first overall by the New York Islanders.

Hedman has drawn comparisons to Hart Trophy-winning defenseman Chris Pronger, who is also 6' 6" and 220 lbs, as well as also being drafted second overall.

Tampa Bay Lightning

Early years in Tampa, rising star amongst defencemen (2009–2017)
Hedman made his NHL debut for the Lightning on 3 October 2009, against the Atlanta Thrashers. He registered his first point, an assist, on a Martin St. Louis goal. His first NHL goal was then scored on 5 December against Dwayne Roloson of the New York Islanders.

On 5 January 2011, during his sophomore NHL season in 2010–11, Hedman checked Pittsburgh Penguins captain Sidney Crosby from behind, receiving a minor boarding penalty. The hit was one of two that were eventually blamed for causing a severe concussion on Crosby that kept him out of play for over a year.

On 29 November 2011, shortly into the 2011–12 season, Hedman signed a five-year, $20 million contract extension with Tampa Bay. On 25 September 2012, it was announced that Hedman signed a contract with Barys Astana of the KHL during the 2012–13 NHL lockout.

During the 2013–14 season, Hedman had a breakout season, posting a career best in goals (13), assists (42) and points (55). Hedman followed up his breakout season with a strong start to the 2014–15 season. However, his start would be derailed after he suffered a broken finger, which was expected to rule him out of play for four to six weeks. At the time, Hedman was tied for the lead amongst NHL defensemen with seven points, and was considered a possible James Norris Memorial Trophy candidate for Defenseman of the Year entering into the season. Despite the injury, Hedman still had a productive season with the Lightning, scoring 10 goals, 28 assists and 38 points in 59 games played. After Game 2 of the Stanley Cup Final against the Chicago Blackhawks, Hedman had recorded the most points by a Lightning defensemen in a single playoff year, with one goal, 11 assists and 12 points. On 8 June 2015, during Game 3 of the Final series, Hedman set Lightning records for career playoff assists (20) and points (23) by a defenseman, surpassing Dan Boyle, who previously held the record with three goals and 19 assists (22 points).

On 24 October 2015, Hedman played in his 400th career NHL game in an OT loss to the Chicago Blackhawks. On 20 December, Hedman recorded his 200th NHL point, which was an assist on a Nikita Kucherov power play goal. The point came during a 5–2 Lightning victory over the visiting Ottawa Senators. On 20 May 2016, Hedman recorded two assists in a 4–3 Lightning win over the Pittsburgh Penguins. The two assists moved Hedman past Vincent Lecavalier (28) and Brad Richards (29) for number two all-time in playoff assists with the franchise. On 24 May, Hedman became the leader in playoff games played for the Lightning. He surpassed former teammates Martin St. Louis and Vincent Lecavalier, who were tied for the most playoffs games played in franchise history.

On 1 July 2016, the Lightning re-signed Hedman to an eight-year contract extension worth $7.875 million per season. Hedman lead all Lightning defensemen in goals, assists (37), points and plus/minus. He also led all Lightning skaters in plus/minus, average ice time (23:03), takeaways (48) and blocked shots (132). He also posted a career high with a plus-21 rating. Hedman currently ranks third all-time in franchise history among defensemen in career points (229), behind Dan Boyle (253) and Pavel Kubina (243). He is also second all-time among defensemen in assists (180) and fourth for goals (49). Hedman ranks third all-time among Lightning defensemen for games played, trailing only Pavel Kubina (662) and Cory Sarich (490). In addition, Hedman is the Bolts' all-time playoff leader for points, goals, assists and plus/minus among defensemen. On 26 October, Hedman recorded his 50th career NHL goal. The goal came in a 7–3 Lightning victory over the Toronto Maple Leafs at the Air Canada Centre. On 5 November, Hedman recorded his 187th assist, which tied him with Dan Boyle for most career assists by a Lightning defenseman. The assist came in a 4–1 Lightning victory over the visiting New Jersey Devils. On 10 November, Hedman recorded his 188th career assist which is the most assists by a defenseman in Lightning history. Hedman is now seventh in franchise history in assists. On 14 November, Hedman recorded his 189th assist, which tied with Brian Bradley for 6th in assists in Lightning history. The assist came in a 4–0 Lightning win over the New York Islanders at the Barclays Center. On 15 November, Hedman recorded his 190th assist, which moved Hedman past Bradley for sixth all time in assists in Lightning history. The assist came in a 4–3 win over the Detroit Red Wings at Joe Louis Arena. On 21 November, Hedman recorded an assist, which was Hedman's 243rd career point. This put Hedman into a tie with Pavel Kubina for 10th place on the Lightning's all-time scoring list. Hedman is also tied with Kubina for second all-time in points by a defensemen in Lightning history. On 23 November, Hedman recorded a goal in a 4–2 Lightning victory over the visiting Philadelphia Flyers. This was Hedman's 244th career point, which moved him past Kubina for second in points by a defenseman and 10th in points in Lightning history. On 14 December, Hedman skated in his 500th career NHL game, which came in a 6–3 Lightning victory over the Calgary Flames. Additionally, Hedman recorded three assists, and now only needs two points to tie Dan Boyle (253) for most all-time points by a Lightning defenseman. On 16 December, Heman recorded his 253rd career NHL point, which moved him into a tie with Dan Boyle. On 17 December, Hedman became the all-time leader in points by a defenseman with his 254th career point. Hedman also moved into ninth place on the all-time franchise list for all skaters. On 20 December, Hedman recorded his 200th career NHL assist. Hedman also became the first defensemen in Lightning history to record 200 career assists. On 28 December, Hedman recorded two points to move past Chris Gratton in to eighth place on the Lightning's all-time scoring list. On 10 January 2017, Hedman was named to the 2017 NHL All-Star game as a member of the Atlantic Division team. On 23 February, Hedman recorded his 526th and 527th career hits against the Calgary Flames, which moved him past Eric Brewer for the most hits in Lightning history. On 11 March, Hedman recorded his 287th career point in a Lightning uniform. This moved him past Fredrik Modin for 7th most points all-time in franchise history. On 27 March, Hedman recorded his 50th assist of the season to become the first defenseman in Lightning history to record 50th assists in a single season. On 30 March, Hedman recorded an assist in the second period to move him past Roman Hamrlik for the most points (66) in a single season by a defenseman in Lightning history. On 6 April, Hedman recorded three assists to become the first defenseman in Lightning history to reach 70-points in a single season. Hedman also joined Börje Salming, Nicklas Lidström, and Erik Karlsson as the only Swedish defensemen to reach 70-points in a single season. On 9 April, Hedman recorded a goal and an assist in a 4–2 Lightning win over the visiting Buffalo Sabres. Hedman's two points moved him past Brian Bradley for sixth all-time in franchise history in points (301). On 21 April, Hedman was named as a finalist for the James Norris Memorial Trophy, which is awarded annually to the NHL's top defenseman. Hedman finished third in Norris voting that season. On 21 June, Hedman was named as a NHL Second Team All Star for the 2016–17 season.

Norris Trophy and back-to-back Stanley Cup wins (2017–present)
On 12 October 2017, Hedman skated in his 553rd game, which moved Hedman past Brad Richards for fifth most games played in Lightning history. On the same night, Hedman recorded his 66th goal in his career. This goal moved him into a tie with Dan Boyle for second most goals by a Lightning defensemen in franchise history. On 4 November, Hedman recorded two assists in a 5–4 Lightning win over the visiting Columbus Blue Jackets. The two assists moved Hedman past Václav Prospal (245) for fifth most assists in Lightning franchise history. On 10 January 2018, Hedman was named to the 2018 NHL All-Star Game. Hedman also became the only defenseman in Lightning history to be named to multiple All-Star games. However, he could not play due to injury and he was replaced by Brayden Point. Hedman was unable to play in the All-Star game due to an injury suffered prior to the event. However, Hedman did participate in the event by serving an assistant equipment manager. On 8 February, Hedman recorded a goal in a 5–2 win over the visiting Vancouver Canucks. The goal moved Hedman past Pavel Kubina for the most goals by a defenseman in franchise history. On 3 March, Hedman recorded a four-point game in a 7–6 Lightning shootout win over the visiting Philadelphia Flyers. With his four-point effort Hedman became the only defenseman in Lightning history to record multiple 4+ point games. On 20 June, Hedman won the James Norris Memorial Trophy for the first time in his career. This was Hedman's second nomination for the award in his career. Hedman was the first defenseman in Lightning history to win the award.

On 29 December 2018, Hedman recorded his 300th career NHL assist. On 10 January 2019, Hedman skated in his 663rd game in a Lightning uniform. This moved Hedman past Pavel Kubina for the most games played by a defenseman in franchise history. On 10 February, Hedman recorded his 400th career NHL point in a 5–4 Lightning victory over the Pittsburgh Penguins. On 7 March, Hedman moved past Dan Boyle for most power play points by a defenseman in Lightning history (127).

On 10 October 2019, Hedman skated in his 700th career NHL game. Hedman became the first Lightning defenseman to play in 700 games. On 5 December, Hedman scored his 100th career NHL goal. Hedman became the first defenseman in Lightning history to record 100 regular season goals and the seventh Swedish-born defenseman to do so. On 30 December, Hedman was announced as a selection for the 2020 National Hockey League All-Star Game. On 23 August 2020, Hedman recorded 2 goals in a 3–2 loss against the Boston Bruins in the first game of the second round of the playoffs. The goals moved Hedman past Lecavalier for fifth most points (53) in Lightning playoff history. On 25 August, Hedman recorded an assist in a game two overtime victory over the Boston Bruins. The assist moved him past Steven Stamkos for fourth most playoff points (54) in Lightning history. The assist also moved Hedman past Erik Karlsson and Calle Johansson for fourth most playoff assists (44) among Swedish defensemen. On 31 August, Hedman scored the game-winning goal and series clinching double-overtime goal over the Boston Bruins. The goal was his fourth of the series and fifth of the playoffs. The 4 goals set a franchise record for most goals by a defenseman in a single playoff series. The fifth goal extended his current Lightning record of most goals by a defensemen in a single playoff year. As the Lightning beat the Stars for their second Stanley Cup in franchise history, Hedman won the Conn Smythe Trophy as the most valuable player in the playoffs. His 10 goals during the 2020 playoffs were the third-most by a defenseman during a playoff year in league history, behind only Paul Coffey (12 in 1985) and Brian Leetch (11 in 1994).  Lightning defenseman Victor Hedman on May 9, 2022 was named a Norris Trophy finalist for the sixth consecutive season.

International play

Hedman played for Sweden at the 2008 World Junior Championships, where he helped the team to a silver medal, losing to Canada 3–2 in the final, and was selected to the tournament All-Star Team. He later became one of the youngest players to play for Sweden's men's team when he made his debut at age 17 in an exhibition game against Norway. Hedman would once again play for Sweden's junior team at the 2009 World Junior Championships in Ottawa, where he met Canada for the second consecutive year in the gold-medal game, earning another silver medal in a 5–1 loss.

On 2 March 2016, the Swedish Ice Hockey Association named Hedman to its roster for the 2016 World Cup of Hockey. Hedman was joined by Lightning teammate Anton Strålman. The tournament ran from 17 Sep to 1 October 2016, in Toronto, Ontario, Canada.

On 15 April 2017, the Swedish Ice Hockey Association named Hedman to its roster for the 2017 IIHF World Championship. On 28 April, Hedman was named as an assistant captain for the tournament. On 21 May, Hedman helped team Sweden capture gold in a 2–1 victory over Canada.

Personal life
Hedman has two older brothers — Oscar Hedman, who was also a professional hockey player that played for Modo Hockey; as well as Johan Hedman, who does not play professionally.

As a child, Hedman originally started out playing as a goaltender. He also played hockey on the streets together with his friends, among them, famous iRacing driver Fredrik Sellgren. His father, Olle Hedman, told his son that if he left the net, he would purchase him the new helmet that he coveted. He has not played in goal since that day. Victor said "I'm thankful for that now. You never know what would have happened otherwise."

Hedman's other passions were flying (he has logged eight hours on a Piper PA-32), and football. His father said that his son would just outrun everyone on the field. Hedman still plays soccer in the summer, and religiously follows the sport. He supports Premier League side Manchester United F.C. In an article it was revealed that when quizzed on any player on any Premier League team, he couldn't be stumped. His dad said that his son "probably knows more about football than hockey." However, "Hedman knew that hockey would be his future, encouraged by some of the game's greats. They'd come back every summer to play for a team called the Icebreakers, inviting Hedman to play." Some notable players on the team included Peter Forsberg, Markus Näslund, Henrik Zetterberg, and Nicklas Bäckström. Hedman said that "looking back at it now, it was an unbelievable experience."

In 2014 Hedman started a hockey school in his hometown. The spots in the school sold out in two hours. Hedman said that "to see the thrill in the kids' eyes, it's worth it all."

Hedman is from Örnsköldsvik and trains with the twins Daniel and Henrik Sedin in the off-season.

In a 2016 interview with The Hockey News, Hedman explained why he wears the jersey number 77. During his childhood in Sweden, he regularly watched Colorado Avalanche games; one of the Avalanche's star players at the time, Peter Forsberg, is Swedish. A memorable moment for Hedman came at the conclusion of the 2001 Stanley Cup Finals, when Avalanche captain Joe Sakic handed the Stanley Cup to teammate Ray Bourque (one of Hedman's favorite players), who had played 22 years in the NHL before winning a championship. Hedman wore the jersey number 41 in Sweden, but when he was drafted by the Lightning, that number was already worn by Mike Smith. Hedman chose his new number, 77, as a tribute to Bourque.

Career statistics

Regular season and playoffs

International

Awards and honors

Notes

References

External links

1990 births
Barys Nur-Sultan players
Swedish expatriate sportspeople in Kazakhstan
Living people
Modo Hockey players
National Hockey League All-Stars
National Hockey League first-round draft picks
James Norris Memorial Trophy winners
People from Örnsköldsvik Municipality
Stanley Cup champions
Swedish expatriate ice hockey players in the United States
Swedish ice hockey defencemen
Tampa Bay Lightning draft picks
Tampa Bay Lightning players
Conn Smythe Trophy winners
Sportspeople from Västernorrland County
Expatriate ice hockey players in Kazakhstan